Franceschetti is an Italian surname. Notable people with the surname include:

Adolphe Franceschetti (1896–1968), Swiss ophthalmologist
Franceschetti–Klein syndrome
Naegeli–Franceschetti–Jadassohn syndrome
Franceschetti-Zwahlen-Klein syndrome
Treacher Collins-Franceschetti syndrome 1
Benito Gennaro Franceschetti (1935-2012), Italian Roman Catholic archbishop of Fermo
Bruno Franceschetti (born 1941), Italian gymnast
Lou Franceschetti (born 1958), Canadian ice hockey player

Italian-language surnames
Patronymic surnames
Surnames from given names
it:Franceschetti